Tweety's High-Flying Adventure is a 2000 American animated musical slapstick comedy film produced by Tom Minton and James T. Walker, written by Tom Minton, Tim Cahill and Julie McNally, and directed by James T. Walker, Karl Toerge, Charles Visser, and Kyung Won Lim, starring Tweety (Joe Alaskey).

The film also features other Looney Tunes characters such as Sylvester (as the main antagonist), Bugs Bunny, Daffy Duck (all three are also voiced by Alaskey), Yosemite Sam (Jim Cummings), Foghorn Leghorn (Jeff Bennett), and Taz (Cummings). Lola Bunny (Kath Soucie) also makes multiple cameo appearances as a news reporter. The animation was made overseas by the South Korean animation company Koko Enterprises. The movie is an updated spoof of Jules Verne's Around the World in Eighty Days.

Plot 
On 2 October, when Colonel Rimfire, at the Looney Club in London, announces about his beliefs that cats are the most intelligent, musical animals (after his many plans were foiled by Cool Cat), Granny, hoping to raise money for a nearby children's park that closes in 80 days, makes a wager that her Tweety can fly around the world in 80 days, collecting the pawprints of 80 cats in the process. Sylvester, still hoping to make Tweety his personal snack, is incensed at the thought of some other cat getting the little bird first and vows to follow Tweety around the world and catch the canary himself; unbeknownst to either one, a thief is also present.

Tweety sets a course to Paris, but is blown by a strong wind to the Swiss Alps, where he gets trapped, as does Daffy Duck, but Bugs Bunny saves them both. He goes back to Paris, this time successfully and outsmarts Penelope Pussycat, where he causes Pepé Le Pew to mistake Sylvester for a female skunk. Tweety continues on to Venice, but grows overweight after eating too much bird seed. On a longboat, he faces a lot of cats, but he overpowers them and goes back to his normal size. While attempting to sleep in Egypt, he is chased into a tomb by Sylvester and several cats, but he escapes. Sylvester disguises himself as a dancing woman in a basket and takes it off as he catches Tweety, but when he sees hieroglyphics, Sylvester thinks he just sees images. A mummy cat army beats Sylvester as Tweety resumes to his escape. In the African jungle, he outsmarts Pete Puma and a lion with help from the Minah Bird.

In Tibet, he befriends another canary known as Aoogah (the name coming from her ability to imitate a horn), after rescuing her from a sacrifice using Hugo the Abominable Snowman. They are taken by more winds into Mexico, Brazil, Argentina and Japan and eventually make it onto a boat to the United States. However, Sylvester catches up with them, but Hubie and Bertie cause him to slide into the water. Tweety and Aoogah are able to save him, but end up on a beach in Australia. Sylvester meets Taz and they team up and chase the two canaries, resorting to a motorcycle, but end up in the ocean with Taz holding the sign from Wile E. Coyote.

Tweety and Aoogah ride a windsurfer to San Francisco. Sylvester hijacks a tram to chase them, but ends up on Alcatraz, to the fury of Yosemite Sam, who appears as the tram's driver. The two canaries make it safely on a train to Las Vegas, where they escape more cats. Afterwards, they go through more cities across the United States, finishing in New York City. There, they trick Sylvester into getting onto a Concorde alone. The two canaries are caught up in an Atlantic hurricane and briefly washed up on an island, but outsmart more cats and escape back through the hurricane.

In a pub in the English countryside, they discover the thief and manage to outsmart him. Sylvester attempts to frame Tweety by passing his license to fly for a stolen passport. He almost succeeds, but the real passport is in his hand, thus getting himself arrested instead to frame Tweety and himself. Tweety and Aoogah believe they are a day late, but discover that it is the 21st of December because they crossed the international date line. They are able to get back to London, only to find that they managed to get just 79 pawprints. Tweety then realizes he forgot Sylvester so he flies into the prison truck taking him away and is able to get his pawprint, thereby saving the park. Tweety gets happily knighted by the Queen for helping find the missing royal passport and Sylvester goes to prison.

Voice cast 
 Joe Alaskey as Tweety, Sylvester the Cat, Bugs Bunny, Daffy Duck, Marvin the Martian, Colonel Rimfire, Henery Hawk and Pepé Le Pew
 Jeff Bennett as Foghorn Leghorn and Bertie
 Jim Cummings as Rocky,  Taz, Yosemite Sam, Cool Cat and Hubie
 June Foray as Granny
 Stan Freberg as Pete Puma
 T'Keyah Crystal Keymáh as Aoogah
 Tress MacNeille as Airplane Worker, Prissy and Queen Elizabeth II
 Rob Paulsen as Sphinx
 Frank Welker as Hector the Bulldog, Hugo the Abominable Snowman and Mugsy
 Kath Soucie as Lola Bunny

Music 
Three original songs were composed for the film alongside various national anthems and folk songs. The cast of the film doubles as the chorus.

Video game 

A video game adaptation of Tweety's High Flying Adventure was released by Kemco in 2000 for the Game Boy Color to positive reviews.

Legacy 
Aoogah, original character of the film, returned in the direct-to-video film King Tweety, as the queen of an island paradise.

References

External links 

 

2000 direct-to-video films
2000 animated films
2000 films
2000s adventure comedy films
Direct-to-video animated films
Looney Tunes films
American direct-to-video films
Warner Bros. Animation animated films
Warner Bros. direct-to-video animated films
Bugs Bunny films
Charlie Dog films
Daffy Duck films
Foghorn Leghorn films
Henery Hawk films
Hubie and Bertie films
Marvin the Martian films
Penelope Pussycat films
Pepé Le Pew films
Speedy Gonzales films
Sylvester the Cat films
Tasmanian Devil (Looney Tunes) films
Tweety films
Yosemite Sam films
Films about Elizabeth II
Films set in Argentina
Films set in Australia
Films set in Brazil
Films set in Buenos Aires
Films set in California
Films set in Chicago
Films set in China
Films set in Egypt
Films set in England
Films set in France
Films set in Italy
Films set in Japan
Films set in the Las Vegas Valley
Films set in London
Films set in Mexico
Films set in Mexico City
Films set in Missouri
Films set in Nepal
Films set in Nevada
Films set in New York (state)
Films set in New York City
Films set in Paris
Films set in Pennsylvania
Films set in Pittsburgh
Films set in Rio de Janeiro (city)
Films set in San Francisco
Films set in St. Louis
Films set in Switzerland
Films set in the Atlantic Ocean
Films set in the Pacific Ocean
Films set in the San Francisco Bay Area
Films set in Venice
2000s American animated films
American children's animated adventure films
American children's animated comedy films
American children's animated musical films
American musical comedy films
American aviation films
Aviation comics
Films based on Around the World in Eighty Days
Films about Yeti
2000s musical comedy films
2000s children's animated films
2000s English-language films